Bray Park may refer to:
 Bray Park, New South Wales, town in Tweed Shire, Australia
 Bray Park, Queensland, suburb of Moreton Bay Region, Australia
 Bray Park railway station, railway station in Moreton Bay Region, Australia